Bellevue is a borough in Allegheny County, Pennsylvania, United States, along the Ohio River, adjoining Pittsburgh. The population was 8,311 at the 2020 census. The borough was incorporated in 1867. There is a public park and library, the Andrew Bayne Memorial Library.

Education
Bellevue is served by the Northgate School District.

History
The land on which the borough currently sits was once part of the Depreciation Lands reserved for Revolutionary War veterans. The first landowners in the area were James Robinson and Hugh Henry Brackenridge, purchasing parcels in 1799 and 1792 respectively. At the time of its organization as a borough, Bellevue had exactly the minimum population for such a designation: 300 residents.

Residents of the area tried unsuccessfully to obtain improvements from Ross Township, but officials were opposed to development along Venango Trail (today Route 19). In response, Bellevue was incorporated as a borough independent of Ross on September 7, 1867. The name of the borough was chosen by J. J. East, a linguist and early resident of the borough, and means "beautiful view."

"Dry" status
Bellevue was always a "dry" town, even before Prohibition, meaning that the sale of alcohol in stores or restaurants was restricted. Sale of alcohol is currently regulated by the Pennsylvania Liquor Control Board (PLCB).  The borough's 2011 primary election included a referendum to permit limited alcohol sales at certain establishments; the proposal was defeated.  A similar proposal in 2015 passed.

Architecture
Bellevue contains over 1,000 buildings over 100 years old. In 2016, to recognize 150 years since the borough's founding, Bellevue's Community Development Corporation (CDC), Bona Fide Bellevue, launched a historic building plaque program, consisting of inventorying all the buildings in Bellevue. Of over 2,600 buildings, just over 730 had been approved locally "historic." Over 150 property owners voluntarily elected to purchase a plaque signifying the historic nature of their buildings.

Three buildings have been further recognized as historic:

Andrew Bayne House - 34 North Balph Avenue - built 1875. Andrew Bayne Public Library. Recognized by Pittsburgh History Landmarks Foundation (PHLF).
Andrew S. and Elizabeth Miller House - 366 Lincoln Avenue - built 1902. Currently a restaurant. Added to the National Register of Historic Places in 2019 and recognized by PHLF.
Marius Rousseau House - 100 Watkins Avenue - built 1906. Private residence. Recognized by PHLF.

Government and politics
Emily Marburger, Mayor

Geography

Surrounding and adjacent communities
Bellevue has three land borders with Avalon to the northwest, Ross Township to the north and east, and the Pittsburgh neighborhood of Brighton Heights to the southeast.  Across the Ohio River to the southwest, Bellevue adjoins Stowe Township.

Demographics

As of the census of 2000, there were 8,770 people, 4,389 households, and 1,953 families residing in the borough. The population density was 8,768.1 people per square mile (3,386.1/km2). There were 4,770 housing units at an average density of 4,769.0 per square mile (1,841.7/km2). The racial makeup of the borough was 88.4% White, 8.40% African American, 0.1% Native American, 0.65% Asian, 0.3% from other races, and 1.8% from two or more races. Hispanic or Latino of any race were 3
1.4% of the population.

There were 4,389 households, out of which 19.8% had children under the age of 18 living with them, 30.6% were married couples living together, 11.0% had a female householder with no husband present, and 55.5% were non-families. 48.1% of all households were made up of individuals, and 13.4% had someone living alone who was 65 years of age or older. The average household size was 1.97 and the average family size was 2.92.

In the borough the population was spread out, with 19.5% under the age of 18, 8.9% from 18 to 24, 35.0% from 25 to 44, 20.6% from 45 to 64, and 16.0% who were 65 years of age or older. The median age was 37 years. For every 100 females, there were 80.7 males. For every 100 females age 18 and over, there were 76.9 males.

The median income for a household in the borough was $31,481, and the median income for a family was $42,382. Males had a median income of $30,683 versus $26,596 for females. The per capita income for the borough was $19,246. About 7.8% of families and 18.3% of the population were below the poverty line, including 11.2% of those under age 18 and 9.7% of those age 65 or over.

Notable people
Thomas McKee Bayne (1836–1894), former member of the United States House of Representatives
Matt Driscoll, head men's basketball coach for University of North Florida
Ron Frenz (born 1960), comic book artist for Marvel Comics
Jerry Interval (1923–2006), portrait photographer
Philip Childs Keenan (1908-2000), astronomer and co-developer of the MKK stellar spectral classification scheme
Sam Parks, Jr. (1909–1997), golfer, 1935 U.S. Open champion
Tom Sherman (born 1945), former NFL quarterback

See also
List of cities and towns along the Ohio River

References

External links

 Borough website
 2011 official election results

Pennsylvania populated places on the Ohio River
Populated places established in 1796
Boroughs in Allegheny County, Pennsylvania
1796 establishments in Pennsylvania